Petronius Maximus ( 39731 May 455) was Roman emperor of the West for two and a half months in 455. A wealthy senator and a prominent aristocrat, he was instrumental in the murders of the Western Roman magister militum, Aëtius, and the Western Roman emperor, Valentinian III.

Maximus secured the throne the day after Valentinian's death by ensuring the backing of the Senate and by bribing the palace officials. He strengthened his position by forcing Valentinian's widow to marry him and forcing Valentinian's daughter to marry his son. He cancelled the betrothal of his new wife's daughter to the son of the Vandal king Genseric. This infuriated both his stepdaughter and Genseric, who sent a fleet to Rome. Maximus failed to obtain troops from the Visigoths and he fled as the Vandals arrived, became detached from his retinue and bodyguard in the confusion, and was killed. The Vandals thoroughly sacked Rome.

Early career
Petronius Maximus was born about 397. Although he was of obscure origin, it is believed that he belonged to the Anicius and Petronius families. Related to the later Emperor Olybrius, Maximus was the son of Anicius Probinus, and the grandson of Anicia Faltonia Proba and Sextus Claudius Petronius Probus, who was prefect of Illyricum in 364, prefect of Gaul in 366, prefect of Italy from 368 to 375 and again in 383 and consul in 371.

Maximus had a remarkable early career. His earliest known office was praetor, held in about 411; around 415 he served as a tribunus et notarius, which was an entry position to the imperial bureaucracy and led to his serving as comes sacrarum largitionum (count of the sacred largess) between 416 and 419. From January or February 420 to August or September 421 he was praefectus urbi of Rome, meaning that he had executive authority for much of the municipal administration of Rome; he held the office again sometime before 439. As praefectus he restored the Old St. Peter's Basilica. He was also appointed praetorian prefect, a leading military and judicial position, sometime between 421 and 439. It was either while holding this post or during his second urban prefecture that he was appointed consul for the year 433. Becoming a consul was considered the highest honour of the Roman state. From August 439 to February 441 he held the praetorian prefecture of Italy, the most important administrative and judicial non-imperial position in the Western Empire. He was awarded a second consulship in 443. In 445 he was granted the title of patrician, the Empire's senior honorific title, which was limited to a very small number of holders. During this year he was briefly the most honoured of all non-imperial Romans, until the third consulate of Flavius Aëtius, generalissimo, or magister militum, of the Western Empire, the following year. Between 443 and 445 Maximus built a forum, the Forum Petronii Maximi, in Rome, on the Caelian Hill between the via Labicana and the Basilica di San Clemente.

Murder of Valentinian III and accession of Maximus
According to the historian John of Antioch, Maximus poisoned the mind of the Emperor against Aëtius, resulting in the murder of his rival at the hands of Valentinian III. John's account has it that Valentinian and Maximus placed a wager on a game that Maximus ended up losing. As he did not have the money available, Maximus left his ring as a guarantee of his debt. Valentinian then used the ring to summon to court Lucina, the chaste and beautiful wife of Maximus, whom Valentinian had long lusted after. Lucina went to the court, believing she had been summoned by her husband, but instead found herself at dinner with Valentinian. Although initially resisting his advances, the Emperor managed to wear her down and succeeded in raping her. Returning home and meeting Maximus, she accused him of betrayal, believing that he had handed her over to the Emperor. Although Maximus swore revenge, he was equally motivated by ambition to supplant "a detested and despicable rival", so he decided to move against Valentinian.

According to John of Antioch, Maximus was acutely aware that while Aëtius was alive he could not exact vengeance on Valentinian, so Aëtius had to be removed. He therefore allied himself with a eunuch of Valentinian's, the primicerius sacri cubiculi Heraclius, who had long opposed the general, with the hope of exercising more power over the emperor. The two of them convinced Valentinian that Aëtius was planning to assassinate him and urged him to kill his magister militum during a meeting, which Valentinian did with his own hands, with the help of Heraclius, on 21 September 454.

Once Aëtius was dead, Maximus asked Valentinian for Aëtius's now-vacant position, but the Emperor refused; Heraclius, in fact, had advised the Emperor not to allow anyone to possess the power that Aëtius had wielded. According to John of Antioch, Maximus was so irritated by Valentinian's refusal to appoint him as his magister militum that he decided to have Valentinian assassinated as well. He chose as accomplices Optilia and Thraustila, two Scythians who had fought under the command of Aetius and who, after the death of their general, had been appointed as Valentinian's escort.

Maximus easily convinced them that Valentinian was the only one responsible for the death of Aetius, and that the two soldiers must avenge their old commander, while at the same time also promising them a reward for the betrayal of the Emperor. On 16 March 455 Valentinian, who was in Rome, went to Campus Martius with some guards, accompanied by Optilia, Thraustila and their men. As soon as the Emperor dismounted to practice with the bow, Optilia came up with his men and stabbed him in the temple. As Valentinian turned to look at his attacker, Optila finished him off with another thrust of his blade. At the same moment, Thraustila killed Heraclius. The two Scythians took the imperial diadem and robe and brought them to Maximus.

The sudden and violent death of Valentinian III left the Western Roman Empire without an obvious successor to the throne. Several candidates were supported by various groups of the imperial bureaucracy and the military. In particular, the army's support was split among three main candidates: Maximianus, the former domesticus (bodyguard) of Aëtius, who was the son of an Egyptian merchant named Domninus who had become rich in Italy; the future emperor Majorian, who commanded the army after the death of Aetius and who had the backing of the Empress Licinia Eudoxia; and Maximus himself, who had the support of the Roman Senate and who secured the throne on 17 March by distributing money to the officials of the imperial palace.

Reign and death
After gaining control of the royal palace, Maximus consolidated his hold on power by immediately marrying Licinia Eudoxia, the widow of Valentinian. She married him reluctantly, suspecting that he had been involved in the murder of her late husband; and indeed Maximus treated Valentinian III's assassins with considerable favour. The eastern court at Constantinople refused to recognise his accession. To further secure his position Maximus quickly appointed Avitus as magister militum and sent him on a mission to Toulouse to gain the support of the Visigoths. He also proceeded to cancel the betrothal of Licinia's daughter, Eudocia, to Huneric, the son of the Vandal king Geiseric, and marry her to his own son. Again he anticipated that this would further his and his family's imperial credentials. This repudiation infuriated the Vandal king, who only needed the excuse of Licinia's despairing appeal to the Vandal court to begin preparations for the invasion of Italy.

By May, within two months of Maximus gaining the throne, news reached Rome that Geiseric was sailing for Italy. As the news spread, panic gripped the city and many of its inhabitants took to flight. The Emperor, aware that Avitus had not yet returned with the expected Visigothic aid, decided that it was fruitless to mount a defence against the Vandals. So he attempted to organise his escape, urging the Senate to accompany him. However, in the panic, Petronius Maximus was abandoned by his bodyguard and entourage and left to fend for himself.

As Maximus rode out of the city on his own on 31 May 455, he was set upon by an angry mob, which stoned him to death (another account has it that he was killed by "a certain Roman soldier named Ursus"). His body was mutilated and flung into the Tiber. He had reigned for only seventy-five days. His son from his first marriage, Palladius, who had held the title of caesar between 17 March and 31 May, and who had married his stepsister Eudocia, was probably executed.

Aftermath

On 2 June 455, three days after Maximus' death, Geiseric captured the city of Rome and sacked it for two weeks. Amidst the pillaging and looting of the city, and in response to the pleas of Pope Leo I, the Vandals are said to have refrained from arson, torture, and murder. Such modern historians as John Henry Haaren state that temples, public buildings, private houses and even the emperor's palace were destroyed. The Vandals also shipped many boatloads of Romans to North Africa as slaves, destroyed works of art and killed a number of citizens. The Vandals' activities during the sack gave rise to the modern term vandalism. Geiseric also carried away the empress Licinia Eudoxia and her daughters Placidia and Eudocia.

See also
 Ancient Rome: The Rise and Fall of an Empire

References

Sources
 
 
 
 
 
 
 
 
 

390s births
455 deaths
4th-century Romans
5th-century Christians
5th-century murdered monarchs
5th-century Roman emperors
5th-century Roman consuls
Comites sacrarum largitionum
Deaths by stoning
Imperial Roman consuls
Imperial Roman praetors
Murdered Roman emperors
Patricii
Maximus
Praetorian prefects of Italy
Theodosian dynasty
Urban prefects of Rome
Year of birth uncertain
Lynching deaths